Abraham and Isaac, also known as the Sacrifice of Isaac (Italian: Sacrificio di Isacco), is an oil painting by the Venetian painter Titian. It was made in about 1543–1544 for the church of Santo Spirito, but is now in the basilica of Santa Maria della Salute.

Subject 

Abraham was commanded by God to offer up Isaac as a human sacrifice in the land of Moriah. Proceeding to obey, he was prevented by an angel as he was about to sacrifice his son, and slew a ram which he found on the spot. As a reward for his obedience he received another promise of a numerous seed and abundant prosperity.

History 
It was about the beginning of the 1540s that Titian received commissions for a great number of pictures from the brothers of the church of Santo Spirito, who possessed the work of his early career, the San Marco Enthroned. One altarpiece represented the Descent of the Holy Spirit, but having been damaged had to be restored later by Titian. The picture on the same subject, which is now in the Church of the Salute, belongs to another period in Titian's activity. The whole collection of art treasures from Santo Spirito was transported to the Church of the Salute in the seventeenth century, where they remain today.

In the ceiling of the sacristy of the Salute, above the altar, are three creations of this period: Cain and Abel, Abraham and Isaac, and David and Goliath.

Analysis 
Georg Gronau writes of these three pictures collectively:

Gallery

See also 
 Sacrifice of Isaac (Andrea del Sarto)
 Sacrifice of Isaac (Caravaggio)
 The Sacrifice of Isaac (Rembrandt)
 Abraham's Sacrifice of Isaac

References

Sources 
 Biadene, Susanna, ed. (1990). "Ceiling of the Church of Santo Spirito in Isola". Translated by Hecker, Sharon; Rylands, Philip; Wilkins, Elizabeth. In Titian: Prince of Painters. Italy: Prestel. pp. 255–58.
 Cook, Stanley Arthur (1911). "Abraham". In Chisholm, Hugh (ed.). Encyclopædia Britannica. Vol. 1 (11th ed.). Cambridge University Press. pp. 69–72.
 Gronau, Georg (1904). Titian. London: Duckworth and Co; New York: Charles Scribner's Sons. pp. 123–25, 300.
 Kahr, Madlyn (1966). "Titian's Old Testament Cycle". Journal of the Warburg and Courtauld Institutes, 29: pp. 193–205. 
 Ricketts, Charles (1910). Titian. London: Methuen & Co. Ltd. pp. 102, 103.

1540s paintings
Paintings by Titian
Paintings depicting the Sacrifice of Isaac